The Doridina, common name dorid nudibranchs, are a taxonomic suborder of sea snails or slugs, marine gastropod molluscs in the order Nudibranchia. Bouchet & Rocroi (2005) rejected the name Anthobranchia on the grounds that it also included Onchidium at the time of original publication. Doridina  is equivalent and used in the latest classification.

A morphological phylogenetic study, published in 2000, by Wägele & Willan showed that the subclade Gnathodoridacea (= Bathydoridoidea) and the subclade Doridacea (= Phanerobranchia + Cryptobranchia + Porostomata) each form a monophyletic group.

In a later study, published in 2002, A. Valdés concluded that the superfamilies Doridoidea and Phyllidioidea (called by him Cryptobranchia + Porostomata) formed a clade. He expanded the usage of Cryptobranchia to encompass the whole subclade Doridacea. This move was not followed in the taxonomy of Bouchet and Rocroi.

Taxonomy

clade Gnathodoridacea (synonym of Bathydoridoidei) 
Superfamily Bathydoridoidea
Family Bathydorididae

clade Doridacea
Superfamily Doridoidea
Family Dorididae
Family Actinocyclidae
Family Chromodorididae
Family Discodorididae
Superfamily Phyllidioidea
Family Phyllidiidae
Family Dendrodorididae
Family Mandeliidae
Superfamily Onchidoridoidea (= Phanerobranchiata Suctoria)
Family Akiodorididae
Family Onchidorididae
Family Corambidae
Family Goniodorididae
Superfamily Polyceroidea (= Phanerobranchiata Non Suctoria)
Family Polyceridae
Family Aegiridae - In Bouchet & Rocroi (2005) is incorrect subsequent spelling Aegiretidae.
Family Gymnodorididae
Family Hexabranchidae
Family Okadaiidae

References

Further reading
Belick F. P. (1975) "Additional opisthobranch mollusks from Oregon". The Veliger 17(3): 276-277.
Goddard J. H. r. (1984) "The opisthobranchs of Cape Arago, Oregon, with notes on their biology and a summary of benthic opisthobranchs known from Oregon". The Veliger 27(2): 143-163.
Lance J. R. (1967) "The holotype of the abyssal dorid nudibranch Bathydoris aoica Marcus & Marcus, 1962". The Veliger 9(4): 410.
Marcus Ev. & Marcus Er. (1962) "A new species of the Gnathodoridacea". Anais da Academia Brasileira de Ciências 34: 269-275.
Valdés Á. & Bertsch H. (2000) "Redescription and range extension of Bathydoris aioca Marcus & Marcus, 1962 (Nudibranchia: Gnathodoridoidea)". The Veliger 43(2): 172-178.

External links

Nudibranchia